Phillip H. Wiebe (August 23, 1945 – October 26, 2018) was a Canadian philosopher. He was the Chair of the Department of Philosophy, Professor of Philosophy and former Dean of Arts and Religious Studies at Trinity Western University and its School of Graduate Studies. He was the author of God and Other Spirits and Visions of Jesus, both from Oxford University Press. His primary areas of research were in philosophy of religion and science, and epistemology.

Degrees 
Wiebe received a B.A. and M.A.. from the University of Manitoba, and a Ph.D. from the University of Adelaide, where he studied under J. J. C. Smart.

Areas of expertise 
Analytic philosophy; philosophy of religion, religious experience. 
 Some have described Phillip Wiebe as a "Mystical Empiricist." 
 Also a noted Shroud of Turin expert.

Works

Books 
 
 
  According to WorldCat, the book is held in 698 libraries

References 

20th-century Canadian philosophers
21st-century Canadian philosophers
Philosophers of religion
Epistemologists
Epistemology of religion
Philosophers of science
Researchers of the Shroud of Turin
1945 births
University of Manitoba alumni
University of Adelaide alumni
2018 deaths
Canadian Mennonites
Mennonite writers